King Range is a mountain range, 22 km (14 mi) long and 8 km (5 mi) wide, in northwestern Victoria Land, Antarctica. The range is bounded on the west by Rawle Glacier and Leitch Massif, on the northwest by Black Glacier and on the NE and east by the head of Lillie Glacier. The range forms part of the Concord Mountains.

The range was mapped by the USGS from surveys and U.S. Navy aerial photographs, 1960–63. Named by US-ACAN for Cdr. James P. King, USN, staff meteorological officer on Deep Freeze operations, 1962–64.

References
 

Mountain ranges of Victoria Land
Pennell Coast